The Super is a 2017 American horror thriller film directed by Stephan Rick and starring Val Kilmer. Phil Lodge (Patrick John Fleuger) is a retired cop who takes up a job in a large apartment building as one of three supers.

Plot 
Phil Lodge (Patrick John Fleuger) is a retired cop who takes up a job in a large apartment building as one of three supers.

As part of being a live-in super, Phil takes up residence in said apartment building with his two daughters, Violet (Taylor Richardson) and Rose (Mattea Conforti). The family has been through a tragedy as it is soon found that Phil’s wife and the mother of his daughters has died. Things seem to have been tense since then, with the adolescent Violet radiating attitude and push back in every conversation she has with her dad.

Prior to Phil moving in, a violent murder happened in the same apartment building. Soon after he begins work, a series of disappearances take place one after the other and Phil begins to notice his youngest daughter, Rose, has begun to have a strange fascination with one of the other supers, Walter (Val Kilmer). Walter, in addition to being mysterious, also happens to dabble in black magic. Phil begins to suspect that Walter is behind the mysterious disappearances and is shown to go to any lengths to protect himself and the lives of his daughters.

Cast 
Patrick Flueger as Phil Lodge
Val Kilmer as Walter
Louisa Krause as Beverly
Mattea Marie Conforti as Rose
Taylor Richardson as Violet
Paul Ben-Victor as Mr. Johnson
Yul Vazquez as Julio
Alex Essoe as Ms.Daigle
Luke Edwards as Brad
Justine J. Hall as Sofia

Production
On August 13, 2018, it was announced that Saban Films acquired the rights to the film.

Reception
On review aggregator Rotten Tomatoes, the film holds an approval rating of 40% based on 10 reviews, with an average rating of 4.9/10.  Noel Murray of the Los Angeles Times gave the film a negative review and wrote, "Still, even bad horror movies can have their pleasures, and here it’s Kilmer who gives The Super a kick."

However, Maitland McDonagh of Film Journal International gave the film a positive review and wrote, "How surprising the story’s twist ending turns out to be depends on how thoroughly steeped in horror moves the viewer is, but it’s well executed down to small details like the creepy clown puzzle with which little Rose likes to play."  Frank Scheck of The Hollywood Reporter also gave it a positive review writing that "it offers a few decent scares as well as the opportunity for Val Kilmer to once again display his unique brand of screen charisma."

References

External links
 
 

American horror thriller films
2017 horror thriller films
Films set in apartment buildings
Saban Films films
Saban Entertainment films
2010s English-language films
2010s American films